The Russian thistle casebearer (Coleophora klimeschiella) is a moth of the family Coleophoridae. It is native to Asia Minor and central Asia, but has been introduced to California, Texas and Hawaii.

Adults are creamy-white.

The larvae feed on the foliage of Salsola australis. The larvae are casebearers and make their cases from hollowed-out Salsola leaves. The larvae have five instars. During the first two instars, larvae are leaf miners, and in the last three they become casebearers. The larvae move from one leaf or even one plant to another. The larvae feed by attaching the case to a leaf, feeding through the epidermis at the point of attachment, and then hollowing out the leaf.

Gallery

External links
Coleophora klimeschiella in North America

klimeschiella
Leaf miners
Moths described in 1952
Moths of Asia